Southern Regional College (SRC) is a further and higher education college in the southern area of Northern Ireland in the United Kingdom. The College has a total of 5 campuses incorporating the two council areas of Armagh, Banbridge and Craigavon and Newry, Mourne and Down.
 
At further education level, the College offers Level 2 Traineeships, Level 2 and 3 Apprenticeships, Level 2 and 3 Diploma’s, Certificates and Extended Diplomas and A-Levels. At higher education, courses offered include HNCs/HNDs, Foundation Degrees, Degrees and Higher Level Apprenticeships. Courses are either full or part-time.
 
SRC currently caters for approximately 10,000 students each year and has in excess of 900 members of staff.

Campuses 
The college's main campuses locations are:
Armagh 
Banbridge
Lurgan
Newry
Portadown

Courses, students and faculty 
The College offers a vast range of courses in most subject areas aimed at those leaving school post GCSE & A-Level and for adult returners wishing to undertake higher education or part-time study at any level. Courses are offered under four Faculty areas: Faculty of Building Technology & Engineering; Faculty of Computing, Design & Academic Studies; Faculty of Health & Science; and Faculty of Professional Studies.

External links 
 Southern Regional College official web site

Further education colleges in Northern Ireland
Higher education colleges in Northern Ireland
Educational institutions established in 2007
2007 establishments in Northern Ireland